Crest of the Wave is a musical with book and music by Ivor Novello and lyrics by Christopher Hassall.

It premiered at the Theatre Royal, Drury Lane in London, on 1 September 1937, starring Novello as both hero and villain, Dorothy Dickson, Olive Gilbert, Walter Crisham and Edgar Elmes. Directed by Novello's frequent collaborator Leontine Sagan, it ran for 203 performances.

The best-known songs from the musical are "Rose of England", "Why isn't it you?", "Haven of your heart" and "If you only knew".  The story concerns an impoverished nobleman, The Duke of Cheviot, who is shot by a lover and pursued by the villainous Otto Fresch. The staging featured a spectacular train crash, one of several Novello musicals featuring a spectacular disaster: Glamorous Night has a shipwreck and Careless Rapture depicts an earthquake.

Original cast
The Duke of Cheviot ("Don") / Otto French (a Film Star) -  Ivor Novello
The Knight of Gantry -   Edgar Elmes	
Stone - Kenneth Howell
Lord William Gantry - 	Peter Graves
Virginia, Duchess of Cheviot - Marie Lohr
1st Woman - Judith Wren
2nd Woman - Dorothy Batley
Leonora Hayden - Ena Burrill
Josef von Palasti - Oscar Alexander
Assistant / 3rd English Type - 	John Palmer
Honey Wortle - Dorothy Dickson
Mrs. Wortle - 	Minnie Rayner
The Queen (in Fair Maid of France) / Manuelita - Olive Gilbert
Freddie Layton - Walter Crisham
Frampton / 1st English Type - Reginald Smith
A Steward / Nightclub Manager/ a Porter - Fred Hearne
Passport Official - Jack Glyn
Telegraph Boy - Sandy Williamson
Chair Steward - Aubrey Rouse
Entertainments Organiser - Harry Fergusson
Filomena/Phyllis - Renee Stocker
Glutz - Finlay Currie
2nd English Type - Basil Neale
Footman - Eric Davy
A Stranger - Charles Tully
The Vicar - Selwyn Morgan

The production was designed by Alick Johnstone.

Critical reception
Alan Bott wrote in the Tatler of the production and of Novello: "Once a year he delivers the formula, the story, the tunes, the ideas for spectacle, the personality, the profile, the archness, the attitudes, and the variegated goods; and that once a year is enough to fill London's Largest Theatre until half-way through the next year. He draws to the Lane thousands who enter a theatre hardly ever. As to his formula, it has given pleasure to a million or two."

References

1937 musicals
West End musicals
Musicals by Ivor Novello
British musicals